Daily Sports  is a Japanese daily newspaper, which first published on August 1, 1948, and today also exists in a news website version, at Daily.co.jp. As its title suggests, it is primarily devoted to sports journalism, but also carries some entertainment and other news. Its operations are headquartered in Chuo-ku, Kobe, and its publisher also maintains offices in Tokyo, Osaka, Hiroshima, and Takamatsu. Daily Sports's more general-audience sister newspaper is Kobe Shimbun, with close corporate ties, though they are technically operated by separate registered companies at the same address. The publication is unrelated to the somewhat similarly named Daily News Online

References

External links
 

1948 establishments in Japan
Daily newspapers published in Japan
Publications established in 1948
Sports newspapers published in Japan
Mass media in Kobe
Japanese-language newspapers